, also known as , is an anime, manga and novel series created by manga artist Go Nagai. It is given the international title Space Adventure: The Deity on the official TMS website. The manga was originally published in tankōbon format by Shogakukan in 4 volumes in 1984. The novelization was published in 1984 and lasted 10 volumes. The three of them share the same basic premise but have a different story.

Plot
A Japanese teen named Yamato Hino, a young sports enthusiast, during a quiet and ordinary day begins to feel strange calls from an indefinite dimension. Frightened and confused, the boy thinks that he had hallucinations but during a thunderstorm a lightning bolt drags him into a parallel world: the ancient kingdom of Mu, ruled by King Muraji whose concern is to defend the capital of his kingdom, attacked by monsters commanded by the evil Dorado of the Empire of Dinosaurs.

In the kingdom of Mu, a legend tells of a titanic being that stands ready to defend the population from any threat and the king wants to awaken the giant statue of the god Mazinger; to do this he needs a brave boy whose name is Yamato, the only one capable of awakening the mighty giant. The devout prayers of the king and the princess are heard: the boy arrives to the dimension of Mu and the statue suddenly becomes alive. A luminous beam covers the boy that is absorbed into the body of the statue, which begins to move. When the monsters of Dorado broke through the defenses of the kingdom, God Mazinger defeats the dinosaurs and makes the enemy army flee. And thus the legend becomes a reality.

Yamato joins the court of newly crowned Queen Aira Mu, becoming the champion of the Kingdom of Mu, always ready to repel the attacks of the evil Dorado and his fearsome dinosaurs.

Anime

Episodes

Source(s)

The scheduled broadcast of August 19, 1984 was cut for the 1984 Summer Olympics. Of the originally planned 24 episodes, one episode was cut and the 24th episode  was not aired.

Manga
The manga, although it shares some similarities and the same premise, differs from the anime with a more mature tone and also has a different conclusion. It was originally published in tankōbon format by Shogakukan in 1984. It was later re-printed by Kadokawa Shoten in 1986, Chuokoron-sha in 1995 and Daitosha in 1998. It was published by Shogakukan and Kadokawa Shoten under the title Mazin Legend and by Chuokoron-sha and Daitosha under the title God Mazinger.

Shogakukan (Tentomushi Comics)

Kadokawa Shoten (Yamato Comics)

Chuokoron-sha (Chuko Aizoban)

Daitosha (St Comics)

The manga has also been published in ebook format by ebookjapan.

Novel
The novelization also expands the basic story and has several differences with both the anime and the manga. It was written by Yasutaka Nagai (volumes 1, 4, 7, 10), Tatsuhiko Dan (volumes 2, 5, 8) and Hideki Sonoda (volumes 3, 6, 9), with illustrations by Go Nagai. It was published by Kadokawa Shoten under the label Kadokawa Bunko.

Media

Home video
In Japan, the anime series was released in home video format in the 1980s by the company VAP and it was also released in VHS by Maxam in 2000. The series has also been released in DVD format two times.

Additionally, the whole series is available in several video on demand internet services.

Soundtracks
Two vinyl records were released in Japan by VAP during the 1980s.

Picture books
Besides the manga and the novel, some picture books targeted to children were also released in the 1980s. One was published by Hikari no Kuni, another by Shogakukan and the last one by Asahi Sonorama.

Appearances in other media
Besides its related media, God Mazinger has appeared in other media. The most prominent is its appearance in the "Dynamic Super Robots Taisen" clips that were included at the end of the DVDs of Shin Getter Robot tai Neo Getter Robot. God Mazinger appears alongside Great Mazinger, Venus A, Getter Robot G, Kotetsu Jeeg, Govarian and Groizer X to rescue Mazinger Z and Aphrodite A, but are defeated and in turn saved by Shin Getter Robot and Grendizer just before the arrival of Mazinkaiser.

In the Mazinger Angels manga, there is a saga dedicated to God Mazinger, where Princess Aira appears controlling a female version of God Mazinger and with the help of Jun Hono defeats the enemies of the kingdom, after Jun and the professor accidentally end up in the Kingdom of Mu. It is later with the help of Aira that Venus A becomes Queen of Gold.

Merchandise
A few toys and action figures based in God Mazinger were released by manufacturer Mark.

Relationship to the Mazinger series
The series is considered as part of the Mazinger saga, if not only for the name of the title and that of his creator. In fact, a Japanese book called Mazinger Bible, released in 2002 for the 30th anniversary of the first Mazinger series, includes the God Mazinger, along with other Go Nagai's manga books that have not been made into anime, such as the adult-oriented MazinSaga, Z Mazinger, and First Comics' Mazinger comic book   released exclusively for the U.S. market in 1988.

Also, the concept of God Mazinger was a candidate to be the sequel of the original Mazinger Z series but, in the end, the sequel was decided to be the concept of Great Mazinger, and later UFO Robot Grendizer.

References

External links
God Mazinger  at The World of Go Nagai webpage
God Mazinger  at the Enciclo'Robopedia website
God Mazinger  at d/visual
God Mazinger  at allcinema

1984 anime television series debuts
1984 Japanese novels
1984 manga
1980s toys
Adventure anime and manga
Fantasy anime and manga
Mazinger
Shōnen manga
Shueisha manga
Super robot anime and manga
TMS Entertainment